Chan Tsz Ka (born 10 February 1990) is a badminton player from Hong Kong. She competed at the 2010 and 2014 Asian Games.

Achievements

Asian Junior Championships 
Girls' doubles

BWF Grand Prix 
The BWF Grand Prix has two level such as Grand Prix and Grand Prix Gold. It is a series of badminton tournaments, sanctioned by Badminton World Federation (BWF) since 2007.

Women's doubles

  BWF Grand Prix Gold tournament
  BWF Grand Prix tournament

BWF International Challenge/Series 
Women's singles

Women's doubles

  BWF International Challenge tournament
  BWF International Series tournament

References

External links 
 

1990 births
Living people
Hong Kong female badminton players
Badminton players at the 2010 Asian Games
Badminton players at the 2014 Asian Games
Asian Games competitors for Hong Kong